Anton (Antal) Waisbecker (29 January 1835 in Güns in Eisenburg comitatus – 4 April 1916) was a Hungarian physician and botanist.

He served as a district physician in the city of Güns and conducted investigations of local flora. Known for his expertise in the study of Pteridophyta, he also made significant contributions involving research within the genera Rubus, Carex and Potentilla.

Published works 
 Köszeg és vidékének edényes nôvényei (1882, second edition in 1891) - Phanerogams of Köszeg and vicinity.
 Beiträge zur Flora des Eisenburger Comitates 1891 - Contribution to the flora of Eisenburg county.
 Ueber die Büschelhaare der Potentillen. 1892
 Carex Fritschii n. sp. 1894
 Ueber die Variationen einiger Carex Arten. 1897
 Bemerkungen über Asplenium Forsteri Sadl. 1898
 Beiträge zur Kenntnis der Gattung Odontites. 1899
 Neue Beiträge zur Flora des Eisenburger Comitats in West-Ungarn. 1903
 Neue Beiträge zur Flora des Comitats Vas in Westungarn. 1905

References 

1835 births
1916 deaths
19th-century Hungarian botanists
Pteridologists
People from Kőszeg